Hongqiao District is a district in the city of Tianjin, China. The name of the district derives from the name of a bridge - Dahong Bridge - on the Ziya River, a tributary of Hai River.

Administrative divisions

Transportation

Metro
Hongqiao is currently served by one metro lines operated by Tianjin Metro:

  - Xibeijiao, Xizhan, Honghuli, Qinjiandao, Benxilu

Education
International schools include:
Wellington College International Tianjin

References

External links 
 Official site 

Districts of Tianjin